Grande Condominiums is a condominium complex in downtown San Diego consisting of two towers, Grande North and Grande South, completed in 2005.

Features 
Each tower of the Grande consists of underground parking, 221 condos, swimming pool & jacuzzi.

References

Residential condominiums in the United States
Buildings and structures in San Diego County, California
Residential buildings completed in 2005